Fontana Unified School District is located in and serves most of the city of Fontana, California, a community in San Bernardino County about 50 miles east of Los Angeles. The district contains 45 schools, which serve students from K-12 to adult education. It was established in the 1920s and unified in 1956. At the December 14, 2016 Board Meeting, the Board of Education appointed Randal S. Bassett as Superintendent.

Board of Education
Board of Education provides direction for operating the District through actions taken at its meetings. Board members, as a body, develop the policies by which the educational programs and other business of the District are carried out. They may not act individually in the name of the Board; action may be taken only when the Board is gathered in a formal meeting with a majority of the members present

Members:

Marcelino "Mars" Serna - Board President

Adam Perez - Board Vice President

Mary Sandoval - Board Member

Jennifer Quezada - Board Member

Joe Armendarez - Board Member

Elementary schools

Middle schools
Alder Middle School
Almeria Middle School
Fontana Middle School
Wayne Ruble Middle School
Sequoia Middle School 
Southridge Middle School
Harry S Truman Middle School

High schools
Fontana A. B. Miller High School
Citrus High School.
Eric Birch High School.
Fontana High School
Henry J. Kaiser High School
Jurupa Hills High School.
Summit High School

Charter schools 

 ASA Fontana

Adult Schools
Fontana Adult School

References

External links
 Fontana Unified School District

Education in Fontana, California
School districts in San Bernardino County, California
School districts established in 1956
1956 establishments in California